Ryuler José Pereira Neves (born 11 January 1969), known as just Ryuler, is a retired Brazilian football defender.

References

1969 births
Living people
Brazilian footballers
Associação Atlética Caldense players
Clube Atlético Mineiro players
Rio Branco Football Club players
Leça F.C. players
Association football defenders
Primeira Liga players
Brazilian expatriate footballers
Expatriate footballers in Portugal
Brazilian expatriate sportspeople in Portugal